Jabotinsky Day is an Israeli national holiday celebrated annually on the twenty ninth of the Hebrew month of Tammuz, to commemorate the life and vision of Zionist leader Ze'ev Jabotinsky.

History
Jabotinsky Day was created by the Israeli Knesset as part of the Jabotinsky Law. According to the law, Jabotinsky Day is held once a year, on the 29th of Tammuz, the day of Ze'ev Jabotinsky's death. On this day; a state memorial service is held on Mount Herzl in Jerusalem. In IDF camps and schools, time is devoted to his achievements and Zionist vision. A symposium is  organized by the Public Council and the Knesset holds a special session.  If Tammuz 29 falls on a Sabbath, Jabotinsky Day is held on the following Sunday.

See also
Public holidays in Israel
Culture of Israel

References

National holidays
Public holidays in Israel
Zionism
Tammuz (Hebrew month) observances
Ze'ev Jabotinsky